The Leather Saint is a 1956 American drama film noir sport film, directed by Alvin Ganzer in black-and-white VistaVision, about a priest who boxes. It stars John Derek, Paul Douglas and Jody Lawrance.

Plot
Although he is a minister, the young Gil Allen likes to work out in Tom Kelly's boxing gym. Gus MacAuliffe, a manager of fighters who doesn't know the young man's true vocation, offers to find him a fight in the ring, but Gil declines.

Gil discovers that the church is desperate to raise funds for two things, a swimming pool for children and an iron lung for a hospital. Without disclosing his profession, Gil agrees to let Gus handle him, and Gil's first opponent is knocked out with a single punch. The impressed promoter Tony Lorenzo arranges another fight for the kid. Lorenzo's girlfriend, Pearl Gorman, a singer with a drinking habit, is immediately attracted to Gil, but when he doesn't reciprocate, she continues to hit the bottle.
  
His superior at the church, Father Ritchie, mentions to Gil that someone mysteriously has donated the first down payment for the iron lung. Gil fibs to the priest that the donor is a well-meaning individual in "the leather business."

Gil's actual identity is discovered by Pearl, who is inspired by the young minister's example and vows to quit drinking. Gil raises all the money that's needed, then gladly returns to his preferred line of work.

Cast 
Paul Douglas as Gus MacAuliffe 
John Derek as Father Gil Allen
Jody Lawrance as Pearl Gorman
Cesar Romero as Tony Lorenzo
Ernest Truex as Father Ritchie
Richard Shannon as Tom Kelly
Ricky Vera as Pepito
Robert Cornthwaite as Dr. Lomas
Edith Evanson as Stella
Lou Nova as Tiger
Baynes Barron as Tony's Henchman

Production
The film was originally about a Catholic priest. However Catholic groups objected due to the romance subplot so the script was adjusted and the main character became an Episcopalian priest instead.

References

External links

1956 films
American boxing films
American black-and-white films
1950s English-language films
Films directed by Alvin Ganzer
1950s American films
1950s sports films